Alain "Alay" Soler (born October 9, 1979) is a former baseball pitcher who played in Major League Baseball for the New York Mets in .

Soler attended high school at Espa Armani Arenado and played baseball for four years. He graduated from Nancy Uranga University with a physical education degree.

He also participated in the World Youth Games in 1996 and was a teammate of José Contreras on Pinar del Río in the Cuban National Series. He later played as a member of the Cuban national team.

Soler defected from Cuba in November, 2003, receiving political asylum in the Dominican Republic. In 15.1 innings, he allowed 14 hits, nine runs, with six walks and 23 strikeouts. He recorded 10 strikeouts and permitted one hit in 5.0 innings of work on October 26 vs. Estrellas Orientales. Soler averaged 13.5 strikeouts per nine innings pitched.

In September, Soler signed a three-year, $2.8 million major league contract with the New York Mets. However, he was unable to obtain a visa for entry into the United States until November, 2005. He began his career as a Met with the Single-A St. Lucie Mets in April, but was quickly promoted to the Double-A Binghamton Mets in May, 2006.

Soler made his major league debut as a starter at Shea Stadium on May 24, 2006. He gave up two earned runs, five hits and four walks in six innings with no decision as the Mets defeated the Philadelphia Phillies 5–4. In Soler's fourth career start (June 10, 2006) he hurled his first complete game shutout, a two-hitter against the Arizona Diamondbacks. Through the first half of 2006, Soler posted a 2–3 record with a 6.00 ERA.

On July 3, 2006, Soler was sent back to the Norfolk Tides after a poor performance the night before against the New York Yankees.

Soler was given his unconditional release by the Mets on March 12, 2007. He had pitched unimpressively during spring training. On March 19, 2007, he signed with the Pittsburgh Pirates. At the beginning of the season, Soler was assigned to the Pirates Double-A affiliate, the Altoona Curve. He went 1–1 with a 6.00 ERA in 14 appearances before being released on June 28, 2007.

Soler signed with the Houston Astros in April , but was released. Soler then pitched for the Long Island Ducks of the Atlantic League. He announced his retirement on September 12, 2008, but in 2009 he would pitch in seven games for the Newark Bears.

See also

List of baseball players who defected from Cuba

References

External links

 

1979 births
Living people
Major League Baseball players from Cuba
Cuban expatriate baseball players in the United States
Major League Baseball pitchers
New York Mets players
St. Lucie Mets players
Brooklyn Cyclones players
Norfolk Tides players
Altoona Curve players
Águilas Cibaeñas players
Cuban expatriate baseball players in the Dominican Republic
Newark Bears players
Long Island Ducks players
Criollos de Caguas players
Cangrejeros de Santurce (baseball) players
Leones de Ponce players
Cuban expatriate baseball players in Puerto Rico
Binghamton Mets players
People from Pinar del Río